The 47th Los Angeles Film Critics Association Awards, given by the Los Angeles Film Critics Association (LAFCA), honored the best in film for 2021.

Winners

Best Film:
Drive My Car
Runner-up: The Power of the Dog
Best Director:
Jane Campion – The Power of the Dog
Runner-up: Ryusuke Hamaguchi – Drive My Car
Best Actor:
Simon Rex – Red Rocket
Runner-up: Benedict Cumberbatch – The Power of the Dog
Best Actress:
Penélope Cruz – Parallel Mothers
Runner-up: Renate Reinsve – The Worst Person in the World
Best Supporting Actor (TIE):
Vincent Lindon – Titane
Kodi Smit-McPhee – The Power of the Dog
Best Supporting Actress:
Ariana DeBose – West Side Story
Runner-up: Aunjanue Ellis – King Richard
Best Screenplay:
Ryusuke Hamaguchi and Takamasa Oe – Drive My Car
Runner-up: Paul Thomas Anderson – Licorice Pizza
Best Cinematography:
Ari Wegner – The Power of the Dog
Runner-up: Greig Fraser – Dune
Best Editing:
Joshua L. Pearson – Summer of Soul (...Or, When the Revolution Could Not Be Televised)
Runner-up: Andy Jurgensen – Licorice Pizza
Best Music Score:
Alberto Iglesias – Parallel Mothers
Runner-up: Jonny Greenwood – The Power of the Dog and Spencer
Best Production Design:
Steve Saklad – Barb and Star Go to Vista Del Mar
Runner-up: Tamara Deverell – Nightmare Alley
Best Foreign Language Film:
Petite Maman
Runner-up: Quo Vadis, Aida?
Best Documentary/Non-Fiction Film:
Summer of Soul (...Or, When the Revolution Could Not Be Televised)
Runner-up: Procession
Best Animation:
Flee
Runner-up: Belle
New Generation Award (TIE):
Shatara Michelle Ford – Test Pattern
Tatiana Huezo – Prayers for the Stolen
Career Achievement Award:
Mel Brooks
The Douglas Edwards Experimental/Independent Film/Video Award:
The Works and Days (of Tayoko Shiojiri in the Shiotani Basin)
Special Citation:
L.A. Rebellion

References

2021
Los Angeles Film Critics Association Awards
Los Angeles Film Critics Association Awards
Los Angeles Film Critics Association Awards
Los Angeles Film Critics Association Awards